Antrodiella is a genus of fungi in the family Steccherinaceae of the order Polyporales.

Taxonomy
Antrodiella was circumscribed by mycologists Leif Ryvarden and I. Johansen in 1980. Of the seven original species it contained, only the type, Antrodiella semisupina, remains in the genus; most of the original species have since been transferred to Flaviporus.

Antrodiella was traditionally placed in the family Phanerochaetaceae until molecular studies were used to determine a more appropriate classification in the Steccherinaceae.  The genus is a wastebasket taxon, containing "species that share common macroscopic and microscopic characteristics, but are not necessarily related."

Description
The fruitbodies of Antrodiella fungi are either crust-like to effused-reflexed (stretched out on the substrate but with edges curled up to form cap-like structures) in form. They have a waxy and soft fresh texture that becomes dense and hard, and often semitranslucent when dry. If it is present, the cap is narrow and light-coloured, smooth to scrupose (rough with very small hard points). The pore surface is light ochraceous to straw-coloured when dry, with small pores, and the tubes the same colour as the pore surface. The context is white to pale straw-coloured.

Antrodiella has a dimitic hyphal system, containing both generative and skeletal hyphae. The generative hyphae have clamps; the skeletal hyphae are typically narrow, hyaline, and thick-walled to solid. Although they are usually unbranched, in rare cases they have a few scattered branches. Cystidia can be absent or present from the hymenium. Antrodiella spores are small, rarely measuring above 5 µm in their longest dimension, and have a shape that is almost spherical, ellipsoid, or allantoid (sausage-shaped). They are thin-walled, hyaline, and non-amyloid.

Species

A 2008 estimate placed about 50 species in Antrodiella.
Antrodiella angulatopora Ryvarden (1987)
Antrodiella brasiliensis Ryvarden & de Meijer (2002) – Brazil
Antrodiella brunneimontana (Corner) T.Hatt. (2002)
Antrodiella canadensis (Overh.) Niemelä (2005)
Antrodiella chinensis H.S.Yuan (2013) – China
Antrodiella cinnamomea Iturr. & Ryvarden (2010)
Antrodiella citrea (Berk.) Ryvarden (1984)
Antrodiella citripileata H.S.Yuan (2012) – China
Antrodiella dentipora Ryvarden & Iturr. (2003) – Venezuela
Antrodiella depauperata (Corner) T.Hatt. (2005)
Antrodiella diffluens (Corner) T.Hatt. (2002)
Antrodiella ellipsospora  (Pilát) Niemelä & Miettinen (2006)
Antrodiella faginea Vampola & Pouzar (1996) – Europe
Antrodiella fissiliformis (Pilát) Gilb. & Ryvarden (1987)
Antrodiella flava (Corner) T.Hatt. (2001)
Antrodiella flavitubus (Corner) T.Hatt. (2002)
Antrodiella foliaceodentata (Nikol.) Gilb. & Ryvarden (1993)
Antrodiella formosana T.T.Chang & W.N.Chou (1998) – Taiwan
Antrodiella fragrans  (A.David & Tortič) A.David & Tortič (1986)
Antrodiella genistae (Bourdot & Galzin) A.David (1990)
Antrodiella globospora Núñez & Ryvarden (1999) – Japan
Antrodiella ichnusana Bernicchia, Renvall & Arras (2005) – Europe
Antrodiella incrustans (Cooke) Ryvarden (1984)
Antrodiella indica G.Kaur, Avneet P.Singh & Dhingra (2015) – India
Antrodiella induratus (Berk.) Ryvarden (1984)
Antrodiella lactea H.S.Yuan (2013) – China
Antrodiella leucoxantha (Bres.) Miettinen & Niemelä (2006)
Antrodiella luteocontexta Ryvarden & de Meijer (2002) – Brazil
Antrodiella mentschulensis (Pilát ex Pilát) Ryvarden (2014)
Antrodiella micra Y.C.Dai (2004) – China
Antrodiella mollis Gibertoni & Ryvarden (2004)
Antrodiella multipileata Log.-Leite & J.E.Wright (1991) – South America
Antrodiella murrillii (Lloyd) Ryvarden (1990)
Antrodiella nanospora H.S.Yuan (2013) – China
Antrodiella negligenda (Corner) T.Hatt. (2003)
Antrodiella onychoides (Egeland) Niemelä (1982)
Antrodiella pachycheiles (Ellis & Everh.) Miettinen & Niemelä (2006)
Antrodiella pallasii Renvall, Johann. & Stenlid (2000)
Antrodiella pallescens (Pilát) Niemelä & Miettinen (2006)
Antrodiella parasitica Vampola (1991) – Europe
Antrodiella pendulina H.S.Yuan (2012)
Antrodiella perennis B.K.Cui & Y.C.Dai (2009) – China
Antrodiella pirumspora Rivoire & Gannaz (2012)
Antrodiella rata (G.Cunn.) P.K.Buchanan & Ryvarden (1988)
Antrodiella reflexa Ryvarden & Núñez (1999) – Panama
Antrodiella romellii (Donk) Niemelä (1982)
Antrodiella semistipitata Bernicchia & Ryvarden (2007) – Italy
Antrodiella semisupina (Berk. & M.A.Curtis) Ryvarden (1980)
Antrodiella serpula (P.Karst.) Spirin & Niemelä (2006)
Antrodiella stipitata H.S.Yuan & Y.C.Dai (2006) – northeast China
Antrodiella subcrassa (Rodway & Cleland) P.K.Buchanan & Ryvarden (1993)
Antrodiella subligativa (Corner) T.Hatt. & Sotome (2013)
Antrodiella subradula (Pilát) Niemelä & Miettinen (2006)
Antrodiella thompsonii Vampola & Pouzar (1996) – Europe
Antrodiella tuberculata Ryvarden & Guzmán (2001) – Mexico
Antrodiella ussurii Y.C.Dai & Niemelä (1997) – East Asia
Antrodiella versicutis (Berk. & M.A.Curtis) Gilb. & Ryvarden (1986)
Antrodiella xanthochroa (Corner) T.Hatt. (2003)

References

Polyporales genera
Steccherinaceae
Taxa named by Leif Ryvarden
Fungi described in 1980